FC Gratkorn was an Austrian association football club from Gratkorn. They played in the Austrian Football First League.

History
Club was founded in 1921 (SV Gratkorn). In 1996, they changed their name to FC Gratkorn.

From 2004 played in Erste Liga (2nd tier).

In 2013 club had financial problems and went bankrupt.

External links
Official site

Defunct football clubs in Austria
Association football clubs established in 1921
Fc Gratkorn